Orthogonius nyassicus is a species of ground beetle in the subfamily Orthogoniinae. It was described by H.Kolbe in 1896.

References

nyassicus
Beetles described in 1896